The 1999–2000 Pittsburgh Penguins season was the team's 33rd in the National Hockey League. It was the first season under ownership led by former superstar Mario Lemieux.

Off-season 
In June 1999, a U.S. Bankruptcy Court Judge granted former player Mario Lemieux ownership of the Penguins franchise, who were in danger of either relocating to Portland, Oregon, or folding. Lemieux received final approval of team ownership by NHL Commissioner Gary Bettman on September 3, 1999.

Regular season 
On April 7, 2000, Jaromir Jagr scored just 13 seconds into the overtime period to give the Penguins a 2–1 road win over the Buffalo Sabres. It would prove to be the fastest overtime goal scored during the 1999–2000 regular season.

Final standings

Schedule and results 

|-  style="background:#fcf;"
| 1 || October 1 || Pittsburgh Penguins || 4–6 || Dallas Stars || 0–1–0–0 || 0
|-  style="background:#cfc;"
| 2 || October 7 || Pittsburgh Penguins || 7–5 || New Jersey Devils || 1–1–0–0 || 2
|-  style="background:#fff;"
| 3 || October 8 || Colorado Avalanche || 3–3 || Pittsburgh Penguins || 1–1–0–1 || 3
|-  style="background:#cfc;"
| 4 || October 14 || Pittsburgh Penguins || 5–2 || New York Rangers || 2–1–0–1 || 5
|-  style="background:#fff;"
| 5 || October 16 || Chicago Blackhawks || 3–3 || Pittsburgh Penguins || 2–1–0–2 || 6
|-  style="background:#fcf;"
| 6 || October 23 || Carolina Hurricanes || 3–2 || Pittsburgh Penguins || 2–2–0–2 || 6
|-  style="background:#ffc;"
| 7 || October 27 || Pittsburgh Penguins || 1–2 OT || Mighty Ducks of Anaheim || 2–2–1–2 || 7
|-  style="background:#fcf;"
| 8 || October 28 || Pittsburgh Penguins || 3–5 || Los Angeles Kings || 2–3–1–2 || 7
|-  style="background:#fff;"
| 9 || October 30 || Pittsburgh Penguins || 1–1 || San Jose Sharks || 2–3–1–3 || 8
|-

|-  style="background:#fcf;"
| 10 || 2 || Los Angeles Kings || 5–4 || Pittsburgh Penguins || 2–4–1–3 || 8
|-  style="background:#fcf;"
| 11 || 4 || Pittsburgh Penguins || 1–2 || Ottawa Senators || 2–5–1–3 || 8
|-  style="background:#fcf;"
| 12 || 6 || Tampa Bay Lightning || 7–4 || Pittsburgh Penguins || 2–6–1–3 || 8
|-  style="background:#cfc;"
| 13 || 10 || Montreal Canadiens || 4–5 || Pittsburgh Penguins || 3–6–1–3 || 10
|-  style="background:#ffc;"
| 14 || 12 || Pittsburgh Penguins || 2–3 OT || Detroit Red Wings || 3–6–2–3 || 11
|-  style="background:#cfc;"
| 15 || 13 || Nashville Predators || 2–6 || Pittsburgh Penguins || 4–6–2–3 || 13
|-  style="background:#cfc;"
| 16 || 16 || Buffalo Sabres || 2–3 || Pittsburgh Penguins || 5–6–2–3 || 15
|-  style="background:#fcf;"
| 17 || 18 || Pittsburgh Penguins || 1–2 || Tampa Bay Lightning || 5–7–2–3 || 15
|-  style="background:#ffc;"
| 18 || 20 || Pittsburgh Penguins || 1–2 OT || Florida Panthers || 5–7–3–3 || 16
|-  style="background:#cfc;"
| 19 || 23 || Toronto Maple Leafs || 1–3 || Pittsburgh Penguins || 6–7–3–3 || 18
|-  style="background:#cfc;"
| 20 || 26 || Ottawa Senators || 0–5 || Pittsburgh Penguins || 7–7–3–3 || 20
|-  style="background:#fcf;"
| 21 || 27 || Pittsburgh Penguins || 3–5 || Carolina Hurricanes || 7–8–3–3 || 20
|-  style="background:#cfc;"
| 22 || 30 || Pittsburgh Penguins || 4–1 || Buffalo Sabres || 8–8–3–3 || 22
|-

|-  style="background:#fcf;"
| 23 || 2 || San Jose Sharks || 5–2 || Pittsburgh Penguins || 8–9–3–3 || 22
|-  style="background:#ffc;"
| 24 || 4 || Pittsburgh Penguins || 2–3 OT || Toronto Maple Leafs || 8–9–4–3 || 23
|-  style="background:#fcf;"
| 25 || 7 || Pittsburgh Penguins || 1–2 || New Jersey Devils || 8–10–4–3 || 23
|-  style="background:#cfc;"
| 26 || 9 || Washington Capitals || 0–3 || Pittsburgh Penguins || 9–10–4–3 || 25
|-  style="background:#cfc;"
| 27 || 11 || Phoenix Coyotes || 2–4 || Pittsburgh Penguins || 10–10–4–3 || 27
|-  style="background:#cfc;"
| 28 || 14 || Boston Bruins || 2–4 || Pittsburgh Penguins || 11–10–4–3 || 29
|-  style="background:#cfc;"
| 29 || 15 || Pittsburgh Penguins || 6–3 || Carolina Hurricanes || 12–10–4–3 || 31
|-  style="background:#fcf;"
| 30 || 18 || Florida Panthers || 5–2 || Pittsburgh Penguins || 12–11–4–3 || 31
|-  style="background:#fcf;"
| 31 || 20 || Pittsburgh Penguins || 1–5 || Montreal Canadiens || 12–12–4–3 || 31
|-  style="background:#cfc;"
| 32 || 21 || Pittsburgh Penguins || 4–0 || New York Islanders || 13–12–4–3 || 33
|-  style="background:#cfc;"
| 33 || 23 || Tampa Bay Lightning || 3–4 || Pittsburgh Penguins || 14–12–4–3 || 35
|-  style="background:#cfc;"
| 34 || 26 || Pittsburgh Penguins || 4–2 || Chicago Blackhawks || 15–12–4–3 || 37
|-  style="background:#ffc;"
| 35 || 29 || Pittsburgh Penguins || 2–3 OT || Washington Capitals || 15–12–5–3 || 38
|-  style="background:#cfc;"
| 36 || 30 || New York Islanders || 3–9 || Pittsburgh Penguins || 16–12–5–3 || 40
|-

|-  style="background:#cfc;"
| 37 || 2 || Detroit Red Wings || 3–4 || Pittsburgh Penguins || 17–12–5–3 || 42
|-  style="background:#fcf;"
| 38 || 5 || New Jersey Devils || 3–1 || Pittsburgh Penguins || 17–13–5–3 || 42
|-  style="background:#cfc;"
| 39 || 7 || Toronto Maple Leafs || 2–5 || Pittsburgh Penguins || 18–13–5–3 || 44
|-  style="background:#fcf;"
| 40 || 8 || Pittsburgh Penguins || 2–6 || Philadelphia Flyers || 18–14–5–3 || 44
|-  style="background:#fcf;"
| 41 || 12 || Pittsburgh Penguins || 1–3 || Phoenix Coyotes || 18–15–5–3 || 44
|-  style="background:#fcf;"
| 42 || 13 || Pittsburgh Penguins || 3–4 || Colorado Avalanche || 18–16–5–3 || 44
|-  style="background:#fcf;"
| 43 || 15 || Pittsburgh Penguins || 2–4 || Nashville Predators || 18–17–5–3 || 44
|-  style="background:#cfc;"
| 44 || 19 || St. Louis Blues || 1–3 || Pittsburgh Penguins || 19–17–5–3 || 46
|-  style="background:#fcf;"
| 45 || 22 || Pittsburgh Penguins || 2–4 || Montreal Canadiens || 19–18–5–3 || 46
|-  style="background:#fff;"
| 46 || 23 || Philadelphia Flyers || 4–4 || Pittsburgh Penguins || 19–18–5–4 || 47
|-  style="background:#fcf;"
| 47 || 25 || New York Rangers || 4–3 || Pittsburgh Penguins || 19–19–5–4 || 47
|-  style="background:#cfc;"
| 48 || 27 || Atlanta Thrashers || 1–4 || Pittsburgh Penguins || 20–19–5–4 || 49
|-  style="background:#fcf;"
| 49 || 29 || Mighty Ducks of Anaheim || 7–1 || Pittsburgh Penguins || 20–20–5–4 || 49
|-  style="background:#cfc;"
| 50 || 31 || Pittsburgh Penguins || 2–1 OT || Atlanta Thrashers || 21–20–5–4 || 51
|-

|-  style="background:#cfc;"
| 51 || 1 || Washington Capitals || 2–3 || Pittsburgh Penguins || 22–20–5–4 || 53
|-  style="background:#cfc;"
| 52 || 3 || New York Islanders || 2–4 || Pittsburgh Penguins || 23–20–5–4 || 55
|-  style="background:#cfc;"
| 53 || 9 || Atlanta Thrashers || 2–5 || Pittsburgh Penguins || 24–20–5–4 || 57
|-  style="background:#fff;"
| 54 || 11 || Edmonton Oilers || 2–2 || Pittsburgh Penguins || 24–20–5–5 || 58
|-  style="background:#fcf;"
| 55 || 12 || Pittsburgh Penguins || 1–5 || New York Islanders || 24–21–5–5 || 58
|-  style="background:#cfc;"
| 56 || 14 || Vancouver Canucks || 0–3 || Pittsburgh Penguins || 25–21–5–5 || 60
|-  style="background:#fff;"
| 57 || 16 || Buffalo Sabres || 1–1 || Pittsburgh Penguins || 25–21–5–6 || 61
|-  style="background:#cfc;"
| 58 || 19 || Pittsburgh Penguins || 2–1 || Florida Panthers || 26–21–5–6 || 63
|-  style="background:#fcf;"
| 59 || 21 || Pittsburgh Penguins || 1–2 || Tampa Bay Lightning || 26–22–5–6 || 63
|-  style="background:#fcf;"
| 60 || 22 || Pittsburgh Penguins || 3–4 || New York Rangers || 26–23–5–6 || 63
|-  style="background:#ffc;"
| 61 || 24 || Pittsburgh Penguins || 3–4 OT || Philadelphia Flyers || 26–23–6–6 || 64
|-  style="background:#fff;"
| 62 || 26 || Boston Bruins || 2–2 || Pittsburgh Penguins || 26–23–6–7 || 65
|-  style="background:#fff;"
| 63 || 28 || Ottawa Senators || 1–1 || Pittsburgh Penguins || 26–23–6–8 || 66
|-

|-  style="background:#fcf;"
| 64 || 1 || Pittsburgh Penguins || 2–8 || Calgary Flames || 26–24–6–8 || 66
|-  style="background:#cfc;"
| 65 || 4 || Pittsburgh Penguins || 3–2 || Edmonton Oilers || 27–24–6–8 || 68
|-  style="background:#fcf;"
| 66 || 8 || Montreal Canadiens || 3–0 || Pittsburgh Penguins || 27–25–6–8 || 68
|-  style="background:#fcf;"
| 67 || 9 || Pittsburgh Penguins || 0–7 || Ottawa Senators || 27–26–6–8 || 68
|-  style="background:#cfc;"
| 68 || 11 || New York Rangers || 1–3 || Pittsburgh Penguins || 28–26–6–8 || 70
|-  style="background:#fcf;"
| 69 || 13 || New Jersey Devils || 3–2 || Pittsburgh Penguins || 28–27–6–8 || 70
|-  style="background:#cfc;"
| 70 || 16 || Florida Panthers || 2–4 || Pittsburgh Penguins || 29–27–6–8 || 72
|-  style="background:#fcf;"
| 71 || 18 || Pittsburgh Penguins || 2–3 || Boston Bruins || 29–28–6–8 || 72
|-  style="background:#cfc;"
| 72 || 19 || New York Rangers || 4–5 || Pittsburgh Penguins || 30–28–6–8 || 74
|-  style="background:#cfc;"
| 73 || 21 || Pittsburgh Penguins || 8–2 || New York Islanders || 31–28–6–8 || 76
|-  style="background:#cfc;"
| 74 || 24 || Pittsburgh Penguins || 5–3 || Atlanta Thrashers || 32–28–6–8 || 78
|-  style="background:#fcf;"
| 75 || 26 || Pittsburgh Penguins || 1–3 || Philadelphia Flyers || 32–29–6–8 || 78
|-  style="background:#cfc;"
| 76 || 28 || New Jersey Devils || 2–3 || Pittsburgh Penguins || 33–29–6–8 || 80
|-  style="background:#cfc;"
| 77 || 30 || Pittsburgh Penguins || 4–3 OT || Washington Capitals || 34–29–6–8 || 82
|-

|-  style="background:#fcf;"
| 78 || 1 || Philadelphia Flyers || 3–2 || Pittsburgh Penguins || 34–30–6–8 || 82
|-  style="background:#cfc;"
| 79 || 3 || Carolina Hurricanes || 2–3 || Pittsburgh Penguins || 35–30–6–8 || 84
|-  style="background:#cfc;"
| 80 || 5 || Pittsburgh Penguins || 4–2 || Toronto Maple Leafs || 36–30–6–8 || 86
|-  style="background:#cfc;"
| 81 || 7 || Pittsburgh Penguins || 2–1 OT || Buffalo Sabres || 37–30–6–8 || 88
|-  style="background:#fcf;"
| 82 || 9 || Pittsburgh Penguins || 1–3 || Boston Bruins || 37–31–6–8 || 88
|-

|- style="text-align:center;"
| Legend:       = Win       = Loss       = OT Loss       = Tie

Playoffs 

|-  style="background:#cfc;"
| 1 || Apr 13 || Pittsburgh Penguins || 7–0 || Washington Capitals || 1–0
|-  style="background:#cfc;"
| 2 || Apr 15 || Washington Capitals || 1–2 OT || Pittsburgh Penguins || 2–0
|-  style="background:#cfc;"
| 3 || Apr 17 || Washington Capitals || 3–4 || Pittsburgh Penguins || 3–0
|-  style="background:#fcf;"
| 4 || Apr 19 || Pittsburgh Penguins || 2–3 || Washington Capitals || 3–1
|-  style="background:#cff;"
| 5 || Apr 21 || Pittsburgh Penguins || 2–1 || Washington Capitals || 4–1
|-

|-  style="background:#cfc;"
| 1 || Apr 27 || Pittsburgh Penguins || 2–0 || Philadelphia Flyers || 1–0
|-  style="background:#cfc;"
| 2 || Apr 29 || Pittsburgh Penguins || 4–1 || Philadelphia Flyers || 2–0
|-  style="background:#fcf;"
| 3 || May 2 || Philadelphia Flyers || 4–3 OT || Pittsburgh Penguins || 2–1
|-  style="background:#fcf;"
| 4 || May 4 || Philadelphia Flyers || 2–1 OT || Pittsburgh Penguins || 2–2
|-  style="background:#fcf;"
| 5 || May 7 || Pittsburgh Penguins || 3–6 || Philadelphia Flyers || 2–3
|-  style="background:#fcf;"
| 6 || May 9 || Philadelphia Flyers || 2–1 || Pittsburgh Penguins || 2–4
|-

|- style="text-align:center;"
| Legend:       = Win       = Loss       = Playoff series win

Player statistics 
Skaters

Goaltenders

†Denotes player spent time with another team before joining the Penguins. Stats reflect time with the Penguins only.
‡Denotes player was traded mid-season. Stats reflect time with the Penguins only.

Awards and records

Awards 

In addition, Owner Mario Lemieux and General Manager Craig Patrick were recipients of the Lester Patrick Trophy for outstanding service to hockey in the United States.

Transactions 
The Penguins have been involved in the following transactions during the 1999–2000 season:

Trades

Free agents acquired

Free agents lost

Claimed via waivers

Expansion Draft

Player signings

Other

Draft picks 

Pittsburgh Penguins' picks at the 1999 NHL Entry Draft.

Draft notes
 Compensatory pick received from NHL as compensation for free agent Ron Francis.
 Compensatory pick received from NHL as compensation for free agent Fredrik Olausson.

Farm teams 
The Wilkes-Barre/Scranton Penguins, previously known as the Cornwall Aces, debuted in the AHL as the top minor league affiliate for the Pittsburgh Penguins. Playing in the Empire State Division, they finished last overall in the Western Conference with a record of 23-43-9-5. WBRE, the NBC station in Wilkes-Barre/Scranton, received a James H. Ellery Memorial Award for outstanding television coverage. Marketing executives Brian Magness and Rich Hixon won the Ken McKenzie Award as the league's outstanding marketing executives.

The Wheeling Nailers of the East Coast Hockey League finished the season in fifth place in the Northwest Division with a record of 25-40-5.

See also 
 1999–2000 NHL season

References 
 

Pitts
Pitts
Pittsburgh Penguins seasons
Pitts
Pitts